The Pokémon World Championships is an invite-only esports event organized by Play! Pokémon. It is held annually in August and features games from the Pokémon series such as the Pokémon video games, Pokémon Trading Card Game, Pokémon Go, Pokémon Unite and Pokkén Tournament (until its 2022 edition). Players earn invitations to the World Championships based on their performance in qualifiers and other tournaments held throughout the season and compete for scholarship money, prizes and the title of World Champion. With the exception of Asia, invitations to the World Championships are administered by the Play! Pokémon program.

History
The Pokémon World Championships first began with the Pokémon Trading Card Game (TCG) in 2004, which was around the time that the franchise was regaining its popularity. In 2009, Play! Pokémon began to organize competitive tournaments for the Pokémon video game series alongside the TCG, which is collectively known as the Video Game Championships (VGC). Like the TCG Championships, players compete with other players in their own age divisions (i.e. Junior, Senior and Masters) in different Premier Tournaments, and the season culminates with the best players earning an invitation to play the Pokémon World Championships in August. The tournaments in VGC are played with a different game each year, mainly, the latest Pokémon game from its main series.

In 2016, Play! Pokémon announced that Pokkén Tournament would have its own championship series and would be played at the Pokémon World Championships. From 2018 onward, Pokkén Tournament DX was used to support its qualifiers and competitions.

In 2019, it was announced that the 2020 Pokémon World Championships would take place in London, United Kingdom, the first time in which the World Championships would be held in a location outside of North America. This is likely due to the setting of Pokémon Sword and Shield, which takes place in a region inspired by the United Kingdom known as Galar, and it is the set of games that would be played by the video game division of the World Championships.

On March 31, 2020, Play! Pokémon cancelled the 2020 Pokémon World Championships and suspended its 2020 season due to health concerns over the COVID-19 pandemic. This came after earlier announcements in March which saw the cancellation of the 2020 European International Championships and part of its season between March and June 2020. On February 9, 2021, it was announced that the 2021 Pokémon World Championships would postponed till 2022 for the same reasons.

In early January 2022, it was confirmed that Pokémon Unite would be played at the World Championships, making it the newest MOBA game to have an official esports tournament, after League of Legends.

In May 2022, after six seasons, Play! Pokémon announced the end of the Pokkén Tournament Championship Series after the 2022 season. 

At the 2022 edition of the event, it was announced that the 2023 World Championships will take place in Yokohama, Japan (the basis of Vermilion City in the Kanto region).  When the 2023 event takes place, it will be the first time that the World Championships visits the franchise's country of origin, as well as the first World Championships to take place in Asia.

World Championship locations

Qualification
The qualifying process for the Pokémon World Championships varies each year and is dependent on a player's age division and the country in which they are located in. Players may also qualify to play on different days of the World Championships based on their performance in their respective qualifying programs; the best performing players will immediately advance to the second day of the World Championships playoffs (i.e. "Day 2") instead of playing through the first day (i.e. "Day 1").

Play! Pokémon program 

Players located in a country with a Play! Pokémon program (i.e. in North America, Europe, Latin America and Oceania) compete in a regular schedule of tournaments for Championship Points and receive invitations when they meet a predetermined threshold of points at the end of the season.

In 2015, the Play! Pokémon program expanded to include countries from the continents of Latin America and Asia (except Japan and South Korea). However, on June 10, 2020, it was announced that Asia would no longer be part of the Play! Pokémon program and will have its own qualifying system towards the Pokémon World Championships.

Pokémon GO Championship Series 

Pokémon announced in October 2021 that Pokémon GO would be added during the 2022 World Championships, along with it a qualification system through the Pokémon GO Championship Series, where the top two head to the World Championships. Any trainer who reached Legend rank during Season 9 of the Pokémon GO Battle League would qualify for the GO Championship Series.

Pokémon Unite Championship Series 

In January 2022, Pokémon Unite producer Masaaki Hoshino confirmed that the game would be part of the roster of games to be played at the World Championships in London. For the first season of the Pokémon Unite Championship Series, there will be eleven supported Regional Zones: North America, Central America, South America-East, South America-West Europe, Oceania, Japan, South Korea, India, and the Asia-Pacific region. These events will only be open to players aged 16 or 18, depending on the region or country they are from.

In each month, a series of tournaments in each Regional Zone will be held. Like other games in the World Championships, players will earn Championship Points based on their finishing position in that month's tournament. The CP can be retained by players to allow for team changes as the season carries on. The team with the most points qualifies for the Regional Championships, and the top teams from the Regional Championships qualify for a chance to compete at the Pokémon World Championships.

Japan & South Korea 
Tournaments in Japan and South Korea are organised independently from Play! Pokémon, and as such, players from these countries have a different system of qualification.

In Japan, players compete for an invite to the Japan National Championships by playing in major qualifier or online tournaments held throughout the season. The best performing players of the Japan National Championships will then be selected to represent Japan in the Pokémon World Championships.

In South Korea, the style of qualification for the World Championships changes frequently. For example, in 2015, players would compete in the Korean National Championships and earn a World Championships invitation based on their standing in the tournament. However, in 2019, players would compete in tournaments organized by the Korean League and earn an invite based on the number of points they had accumulated by the end of the season.

Other 
There are other less common methods of qualifying for the World Championships which include finishing at least top 4 or better in the prior year's World Championships or by participating in a single-elimination tournament known as the Last Chance Qualifier at the location of the World Championships itself.

List of World Champions

Trading Card Game (TCG)

Video Game Championships (VGC)

Pokémon Go

Pokémon Unite

Retired games

Pokkén Tournament & Pokkén Tournament DX

2014 World Championships 

The 2014 Pokémon World Championships was the sixth annual edition of the championships. The event took place in the Walter E. Washington Convention Center on Washington, D.C., alongside the 2014 Pokémon Trading Card Game World Championship who were in their eleventh edition.

The tournament was streamed via Twitch for the first time in the tournament history and reached a viewership of more than 800,000.

The defending Video Game champions were Arash Ommati from Italy (Masters Division), Hayden McTavish from the United States (Senior Division), and Brendan Zheng from the United States (Junior Division). The opening ceremony of the event was attended by Junichi Masuda, the video game designer for the Pokémon franchise and a member of the board of directors of Game Freak.

The finals match of the Masters division is best known and remembered within the Pokémon community for Se Jun Park's victory with the inclusion and use of a Pachirisu on his team.

2014 qualification 
The qualification process for the 2014 Pokémon World Championships was primarily based on Championship Points accumulated by players from official Play! Pokémon tournaments such as Premier Challenges, Regional Championships and National Championships. In addition, the top 4 players of the 2013 Pokémon World Championships in each division, and the top 4 players of a tournament known as the 'Last Chance Qualifier' will also receive an invitation to play in the World Championships.

The invitations for the Masters Division of the tournament were distributed in the following manner:

 Top 4 players from the 2013 Pokémon World Championships,
 Top 32 players from Europe with the most Championship Points,
 Top 16 players from North America with the most Championship Points, 
 Top 4 players from Australia with the most Championship Points,
 Top 2 players from South Africa with the most Championship Points,
 Top 8 players from the Japan National Championships,
 Top 2 players from the South Korea National Championships, and
 Top 4 players from the Last Chance Qualifier, a tournament held the day before the World Championships in the same venue.

Most of the invitations did not include a fully paid trip to the tournament, and as a result several players could not attend the tournament.

2014 tournament structure

Players per country 
Masters Division

Results 
Six rounds of Swiss was played by 60 players in the tournament, and each round was played with a set of best-of-three matches. The top 8 players after the Swiss rounds advances to the best-of-three Single Elimination matches.

The defending World Champion Arash Ommati and former three-time World Champion Ray Rizzo did not advance to the single elimination rounds.

Masters Division

Final standings

2015 World Championships 

The 2015 Pokémon World Championships was the seventh  annual edition of the championships. The event was held alongside the Pokémon Trading Card Game World Championships at the Hynes Convention Center in Boston, Massachusetts.

The tournament was transmitted with live streaming from the official Pokémon Twitch channel. The defending Video Game champions for the year were Se Jun Park from South Korea (Masters Division), Nikolai Zielinsky from the United States (Senior Division) and Kota Yamamoto from Japan (Junior Division).

2015 qualification 
Players could only gain an invitation to play in the Video Game World Championships by either being the 2014 Pokémon World Champions, or by obtaining enough Championship Points in their respective geographic zone designated by Play! Pokémon. However, the only exception to this rule are for players from Japan and South Korea, as their tournaments are not overseen by Play! Pokémon and their invites are governed through a different system of qualification.

Since 2014, players were able to earn Championship Points from various tournaments within their geographical region. The tournaments vary in scale, ranging from local Premier Challenges to state-level Regional Championships and finally the large-scale National Championships. The number of points awarded varies with scale, and players who earn these points are ranked and divided into zones such as North America, Europe and South Africa. This year, two new zones (Latin America and Asia-Pacific) were introduced.

The 2015 Pokémon Video Game World Championship was intended to be played under two Swiss tournaments and one single-elimination tournament which would then determine the 2015 World Champions. As such, there are two types of invites:
 a regular 'Day One' invite, and
 a 'Day Two' invite, which allows players to receive a bye for the Swiss tournament on the first day.

As an example, the invitations for the Masters Division were distributed as follows:
 'Day One' invitation (by Championship Points): 
Top 40 players from North America
Top 60 players from Europe
Top 18 players from Latin America
Top 18 players from Asia-Pacific
Top 2 players from South Africa
 'Day Two' invitation (i.e. 'Day One' bye)
 2014 World Champion
Top 8 players from North America by Championship Points.
Top 16 players from Europe by Championship Points.
Top 2 players from Latin America by Championship Points.
Top 2 players from Asia-Pacific by Championship Points. 
Top 2 players from South Africa by Championship Points.
Top 4 players of the South Korea Video Game National Championships.
Top 8 players of the Japan Video Game National Championships.

2015 tournament structure
The Video Game Championships consisted of two Swiss tournaments and one single elimination tournament played across three days.

On Friday (Day 1), all players who earned an invitation without a Day 1 bye were entered into a Swiss tournament, where players with two or fewer losses would advance onto the next round. The second Swiss tournament was then played on Saturday (Day 2), where players who advanced from Day 1 were joined by players who received an invitation with a Day 1 bye.

At the end of the Day 2 Swiss tournament, the top eight players played in single elimination rounds until the last two remain. The finals took place on Sunday (Day 3).

Final standings (Video Game Championships)

2016 World Championships 

The 2016 Pokémon World Championships was the eighth  annual edition of the championships. The event was held at the San Francisco Marriott Marquis in San Francisco, California, from August 19 to August 21.
For the first time in the tournament history, the Pokkén Tournament invitational was featured alongside the Video Game Championships (VGC) and Trading Card Game (TCG) tournaments. Side events and an official store with event merchandise occurred alongside the event.

The defending Video Game champions were Shoma Honami from Japan (Masters Division), Mark McQuillan from the United Kingdom (Senior Division) and Kotone Yasue from Japan (Junior Division). The defending Trading Card Game champions were Jacob Van Wagner from the United States (Masters Division), Patrick Martinez from the United States (Senior Division), and Rowan Stavenow from Canada.

Age divisions and qualifications 
Both the Pokémon VGC and TCG were divided into three age divisions: the Junior Division (born 2005 or later), the Senior Division (born between 2001 and 2004), and the Masters Division (born 2000 or earlier). For the Pokkén Tournament invitational, players were grouped into either the Senior Division (born 2001 or later) or Masters Division (born 2000 or earlier).

The process of obtaining an invitation is primarily based on Championship Points. Players could earn Championship Points by performing in select online and live tournaments held throughout the 2016 season (between September 2015 and July 2016). Players from Japan and South Korea were excluded from this rule as these countries had their own method of qualification not based on Championship Points.

Play! Pokémon divided players into five different rating zones: US and Canada, Europe, Latin America, Asia-Pacific and South Africa. Different zones had different Championship Points requirements due to the distribution of events around the world.

There are two possible invitations players could obtain:
 a regular 'Day One' invite, and
 a 'Day Two' invite, which allowed players to acquire a 'Day One' bye and automatically enter the second Swiss tournament.

'Day Two' invites were usually accompanied by travel awards and stipends paid by Play! Pokémon.

Trading Card Game Championship qualifications 
The following table shows the Championship Points requirement for an invitation to the 2016 World Championships:

Players in Japan and South Korea were awarded invitations based on each country's organized play system.

Video Game Championship qualifications 
For the Masters Division, the following table lists the Championship Points requirement for an invitation to the 2016 World Championships:

2016 tournament structure 
The Video Game Championships consisted of two Swiss tournaments and one single elimination tournament played across three days.

On Friday (Day 1), all players who earned an invitation without a Day 1 bye were entered into a Swiss tournament, where players with two or fewer losses would advance onto the next round. The second Swiss tournament was then played on Saturday (Day 2), where players who advanced from Day 1 were joined by players who received an invitation with a Day 1 bye.

At the end of the Day 2 Swiss tournament, players with two or fewer losses advanced to play in single elimination rounds until the last two remain. The finals took place on Sunday (Day 3).

Final standings (Video Game Championships)

Final standings (Trading Card Game)

Weapons controversy 
During the 2015 World Championships, two Trading Card Game competitors from Iowa (Kevin Norton, 18, and James Stumbo, 27) brought weapons in their vehicle, which were recovered by the police. The two posted status updates and images of their weaponry on social media, which were noticed by various Pokémon fans who treated them as supposed threats against the tournament. The updates were reported to the Boston Regional Intelligence Center (BRIC), who promptly seized their automobile and then stopped them at the door and barred them from entering the Hynes Convention Center on Thursday evening. Police executed a search warrant on Friday and Norton and Stumbo were arrested at their Red Roof Inn room in Saugus just after midnight on Saturday, August 22, 2015. The two were arrested on charges of unlicensed possession of firearms and ammunition, and were initially held without bail. The weapons recovered were a recently purchased Remington shotgun, an AR-15, a hunting knife and several hundred rounds of ammunition. They plead not guilty at their arraignment on November 10, 2015, and their bail was set at $150,000. On December 2, 2015, their trial was set for May 9, 2016, however, in early April 2016, their trial was postponed to November 2016. Following the release of Pokémon Go in July 2016, Stumbo's attorney indicated that the case would be resolved soon. Norton and Stumbo were later sentenced to two years in prison with an additional two years probation once their prison term ends.

References

World Championships
Recurring sporting events established in 2004
World championships in esports